Marjorie Helen Orwig (June 3, 1924 – June 14, 2000), better known as Margie Rayburn, was an American traditional pop singer.

Rayburn was born in Madera, California, United States, and sang as a member of The Sunnysiders, who had a Top 40 hit in the United States in 1955 with the song "Hey! Mr. Banjo". Rayburn married Norman Malkin, also a member of the Sunnysiders. She also had a Top Ten hit of her own in 1957 with the song "I'm Available", which was written by Dave Burgess.
The single, released on Liberty Records, reached No. 9 on the Billboard Hot 100 in November 1957. As a songwriter she co-wrote with Malkin the 1963 song "Roman Holiday".

Unable to find another hit, Rayburn retired from the music industry in the mid-1960s. She died on June 14, 2000, in Oceanside, California, at the age of 76.

Discography

Albums

Singles

References

1924 births
2000 deaths
Singers from California
People from Madera, California
20th-century American singers
20th-century American women singers
Capitol Records artists
Challenge Records artists
Dot Records artists
Liberty Records artists